Nokusingaperi Guni alias Nox, is a Zimbabwean musician, performing artist, songwriter and producer based in South Africa. He is renowned for the musical movement in Zimbabwe of the early 2000s dubbed Urban Grooves.

Background
Born Enock Guni on the 6th of September 1983 in Zaka, Masvingo in Zimbabwe, he made his debut as Nox with his first major hit “Iwe Maria” in 2002. He started his musical career in the same year when he was spotted by Roy and Royce, a celebrated duo at the time. His entry onto the music arena was through participation with SHAPE Zimbabwe projects leading to his recording of the first track “Iwe Maria”. He studied Marketing with the Midlands State University. 

Nox released his first full album title “Wandipengesa” in 2004 and has had several radio hits in his career which include Ndinonyara, Takafitana, WhatsApp, Uchandifunga, Melody. He has also worked on a number of projects in the region to include collaborations with South African Makhadzi, Mr. Brown, DJ Tira and Master KG. 

In 2009, he released an album titled Music, Love and Me which featured the track Wandinoda. The track was singled out by Sony Music Africa and was to later be used as a soundtrack by MNET for the reality show Big Brother.

Nox has been part of the pioneering team of touring artists for the Urban Grooves genre from Zimbabwe.  He is one of the few artists from that genre still perpetuating the art.

Discography

Albums
Wandipengesa

Rhythm And Blues

Chapter 3

Music Love And Me

Zim’s Finest

Classic Love Songs

8th Wonder

Africa's Best

Ndingazodei E. P

Ice and Roses

The Surprise

African Royalty

Awards
National Arts Merit Awards Outstanding Song Of The Year 2013 - Ndinonyara (Nomination)
National Arts Merit Awards Outstanding Male Artist Of The Year 2013 (Nomination)

Zimbabwe Music Awards Male Artist Of The Year 2013
Zimbabwe Music Awards Artist Of The Year 2013

Zimbabwe Music Awards Best Touring Artist 2014

Zawadiimbabwe Music Awards Video Of The Year 2015 - Zvandadiwa (Nomination)

Star FM Music Awards Best Collaboration 2020 - Waimutambisa ft Freeman HKD
Star FM Music Awards Best Song By Diaspora Artist 2020 - Im In Love
Star FM Music Awards Best Afrobeat Song 2020 - Waimutambisa

Star FM Music Awards Best Song By Diaspora Artist 2021 - Melody ft Master KG

References 

1983 births
Living people
Zimbabwean musicians
Zimbabwean songwriters
People from Zaka District